This page includes the videography of Reggaeton duo Wisin & Yandel. They have filmed around 59 videos during their career. They have worked with many successful directors, but most of their recent music videos have been directed by Dominican Republic film and music video director Jessy Terrero.

Music videos

As solo artists

Wisin videography
Yandel videography

See also
 Wisin & Yandel discography

References

External links
 Official Site
 News & Press
 Official Site at Universal Music

Videographies of Puerto Rican artists